James William Anderson (December 1, 1930 – March 10, 2013) was a Canadian professional ice hockey player and head coach. Anderson played 7 games with the Los Angeles Kings of the National Hockey League (NHL), and was the first head coach of the Washington Capitals. He was born in Pembroke, Ontario.

Playing career
Jim Anderson spent the majority of his 16-year minor league career with the Springfield Indians franchise of the AHL, and remains the all-time leader in games played, goals and points for the franchise. In his first season with Springfield, Anderson scored 39 goals and was awarded the Dudley "Red" Garrett Memorial Award as  AHL rookie of the year in 1954–55. In the early 1960s, Anderson scored 35 or more goals for Springfield for five straight years, helping lead the team to three consecutive Calder Cup championships, to this day the only AHL franchise to win three straight. In 1960–61, Anderson was named an AHL Second Team All-Star, scoring 81 points (the most of his career) with a league-leading 43 goals. The 40 goals he scored in 1963–64 earned him the Willie Marshall Award as the AHL's leading goal scorer, and also led again to be named a Second Team All-Star.

In the 1967–68 season, the National Hockey League expanded to twelve teams, and the new Los Angeles Kings took over the  Springfield franchise as their top minor league affiliate, rebranding them as the Springfield Kings. That season, Anderson finally made his first NHL appearance with the parent Kings, playing in 7 games, and scoring 1 goal and 2 assists.

Anderson's AHL career concluded with 426 goals and 821 points in 943 games, at the time in the top five all-time in each category in the AHL. As of the 2015 season, he remains 11th all-time in games played, fifth in goals scored and ninth in points scored.

Coaching career
Anderson was twice Springfield's head coach (1969-70 and 1975-76), and was the first head coach in the history of the NHL's Washington Capitals.  After being replaced mid-season by George Sullivan,  Anderson became a professional scout for the Los Angeles Kings' organization for 19 years.

In November 2008, Anderson's career was recognized with induction into the fourth class (2009) of the AHL Hall of Fame.  He continued to make his off-season home in the Springfield area, and after retirement was a local skating instructor until shortly before his death.

Career statistics

Regular season and playoffs

Coaching record

References

External links
 

1930 births
2013 deaths
Buffalo Bisons (AHL) players
Canadian ice hockey coaches
Canadian ice hockey left wingers
Detroit Hettche players
Edmonton Flyers (WHL) players
Ice hockey people from Ontario
Los Angeles Kings players
Shawinigan-Falls Cataracts (QSHL) players
Sportspeople from Pembroke, Ontario
Springfield Kings players
Springfield Indians players
Trois-Rivières Lions (1955–1960) players
Washington Capitals coaches
Windsor Spitfires players